Marcia Kure (born 1970) is a Nigerian visual artist known primarily for her mixed media paintings and drawings that engage with postcolonial existentialist conditions and identities.

Early life and education 
Kure was born in Kano State, Nigeria. She trained at the University of Nigeria, Nsukka under painter Obiora Udechukwu and graduated with a Bachelor of Arts in painting in 1994.

Professional career and work 
Kure's early work focused on political violence and the agency of women in patriarchal society. Her later work has been concerned with themes related to motherhood, haute couture fashion, and hip-hop aesthetics. 

Kure had her New York debut at the Skoto Gallery in 1995.

In a 2015 interview for ARTCTUALITE, Kure articulated the influence of space on her work, stating that she "[tries] to make an argument for people who do not have a defined space," and the ways in which she incorporates Western aesthetic techniques alongside those of African:"I am not interested in either or, in what something is or what it is not; rather, I prefer the grey area that deals directly with oppositions and juxtapositions. I find the ability to inhabit different views very inspiring. I think the assimilation of western forms and techniques in my work allows me to integrate and interpret the world through a prismatic lens much better than one who has a singular view."Kure has exhibited internationally with solo exhibitions at the Goethe-Institut, Lagos; Purdy Hicks Gallery, London; and Susan Inglett Gallery, New York. Her work has additionally been featured in group exhibitions at institutions such as the Kemper Museum of Contemporary Art; the New Museum, New York; the Barbican Art Galleries, London; National Gallery of Art, Lagos; and, the WIELS Contemporary Art Center, Brussels. Her work can be found in the collections of the British Museum; the Centre Pompidou; the National Museum of African Art, Smithsonian Institution; The Newark Museum; the North Carolina Museum of Art; the Cleveland Clinic; the Sindika Dokolo Foundation, Luanda, Angola; and, the United States Embassy, Abuja. Kure has participated in the La Triennial (2013); the International Biennial of Contemporary Art, Seville (2006), directed by Okwui Enwezor; and the Sharjah International Biennial (2005).

From January through March 2014, Kure was artist-in-residence at the Victoria and Albert Museum in London. She was awarded the Uche Okeke Prize for Drawing in 1994.

The artist is represented by Susan Inglett Gallery, New York; Purdy Hicks Gallery, London; and, Officine Dell'Immagine, Milan.

Prizes/awards/grants

 2007- 2008: Smithsonian Artist Research Fellowship
 2007-2008: Program Puffin Grant for "Burqua as Shelter," Sculpture, Charleston, South Carolina
 2004: Elena Prentice Rulon-Miller Scholarship Fund/Minority Work Study Grant, Haystack Mountain School of Crafts

Teaching 
 2019: Royal Institute of Art, Stockholm, Sweden
 2004: Teaching Internship, St. Mark’s School, Southborough, Massachusetts

References

External links 

Living people
University of Nigeria alumni
1970 births
Nigerian painters
Nigerian women painters
People from Kano
Nigerian expatriates in the United States